The women's 400 metre freestyle event at the 2000 Summer Olympics took place on 17 September at the Sydney International Aquatic Centre in Sydney, Australia.

Brooke Bennett emerged as a major force in long-distance swimming, after effortlessly winning a first gold for the United States in the event since Janet Evans did so in 1988. She maintained a powerful lead from start to finish, and posted a lifetime best of 4:05.80, making her the third fastest all-time swimmer in history behind Evans and China's Chen Hua. At only 18 years of age, Diana Munz fought off a sprint challenge from Costa Rica's Claudia Poll and Jamaica's Janelle Atkinson on the final lap to take home the silver in 4:07.07, extending a distance swimming legacy for the Americans with a one–two finish. Meanwhile, Poll settled only for the bronze in 4:07.83.

Atkinson made an Olympic milestone as the first Jamaican to reach a swimming final, but missed out the podium by almost a full second in a national record of 4:08.79. Russia's Nadezhda Chemezova finished fifth in 4:10.37, holding off a fast-pacing Hannah Stockbauer of Germany (4:10.38) by a hundredth of a second (0.01). Netherlands' Carla Geurts (4:12.36), and China's Chen Hua (4:13.11), the second fastest all-time swimmer, rounded out the finale.

Records
Prior to this competition, the existing world and Olympic records were as follows.

Results

Heats

Final

References

External links
Official Olympic Report

F
2000 in women's swimming
Women's events at the 2000 Summer Olympics